The Man Who Saved the Louvre is a 2014 French documentary film directed by Jean-Pierre Devillers and Pierre Pochart.

It's about how Louvre director Jacques Jaujard and his curators evacuated works of art before German occupation forces could seize them.

References

External links 
 

French documentary films
French television films
French black-and-white films
2014 films
2010s French films